Stockport Castle was a promontory castle in Stockport, Cheshire. The castle was in the medieval town, overlooking a ford over the River Mersey. It was first documented in 1173, but the next mention of it is in 1535 when it was in ruins. What remained of the castle was demolished in 1775.

Location
Stockport Castle was an urban castle in the town of Stockport. The medieval town was on the south side of a valley at the confluence of the rivers Goyt and Tame, where they form the River Mersey. The site of the castle is a  sandstone spur, overlooking a ford. The castle was flanked by cliffs or steep slopes on its north, south, and west sides.

History
The first mention of Stockport Castle comes from 1173, when Geoffrey de Costentyn held it against Henry II during the barons' rebellion of 1173–1174. There is a local tradition that Geoffrey de Constentyn was the son of Henry II, Geoffrey II, Duke of Brittany; in fact, Geoffrey de Constentyn was a local lord who not only owned the manor of Stockport, but land in Staffordshire and Ireland. The bailey would originally have been defended by a wooden palisade and earthworks; these were replaced by stone walls at the beginning of the 13th century. Two fragments of the wall survive.

Dent suggests that the castle began to decline in the 14th century when the Warren family became Lords of the Manor of Stockport; Stockport was not the only manor that the family owned, and they favoured the manor of Poynton over that of Stockport. The castle falling out of use mirrors a trend with the other castles in the Greater Manchester area; by the 13th century, apart from Dunham Castle, there was no indication of activity in castles in Greater Manchester. According to antiquarian John Leland, the castle lay in ruins by 1535. At this stage, the gaol was still present and a market was held in the castle's bailey. The castle grounds had been divided and rented out by the Lord of the Manor. The ruins were levelled in 1775 by Sir George Warren, the lord of the manor, and a cotton mill built on the site. In 1974, excavations of the motte were carried out to establish how long the castle had been occupied.

Layout
A motte-and-bailey castle was a common type of fortification in medieval England. It consisted of a usually artificial mound surmounted by a tower or keep, with a large defended enclosed area next to the mound and was usually used for storage and barracks. Stockport Castle's motte was where Castle Yard is today, although it was previously called Castle Hill, influencing the name of the area. The bailey was situated south-east of the motte. The castle was probably similar in size and shape to castles such as Launceston in Cornwall and Pontefract in West Yorkshire. The keep surmounting the motte was irregularly shaped, and according to plans drawn in 1775 by the Reverend John Watson, a local antiquarian, measured . No trace of the keep remains from the levelling of the area in 1775 and 1853.

See also
Castles in Greater Manchester

References

Bibliography

Castles in Cheshire
Buildings and structures in Stockport
Buildings and structures demolished in 1775